The Georgiana was a brig-rigged, iron hulled, propeller steamer belonging to the Confederate States Navy during the American Civil War. Reputedly intended to become the "most powerful" cruiser in the Confederate fleet once her guns were mounted, she was never used in battle. On her maiden voyage from Scotland, where she was built, she encountered Union Navy ships engaged in a blockade of Charleston, South Carolina, and was heavily damaged before being scuttled by her captain. The wreck was discovered in 1965 and lies in the shallow waters of Charleston's harbor. 

Due to the secrecy surrounding the vessel's construction, loading and sailing, there has been much speculation about her intended role, whether as a cruiser, merchantman, or privateer.

Specifications

Her clipper bow sported the figurehead of a "demi-woman". Georgiana was reportedly pierced for fourteen guns and could carry more than four hundred tons of cargo. She was built by the Lawrie shipyard at Glasgow - perhaps under subcontract from Lairds of Birkenhead (Liverpool) - and registered at that port in December 1862 as belonging to N. Matheson's Clyde service. The U.S. Consul at Tenerife was rightly apprehensive of her as being "evidently a very swift vessel."

Captain Thomas Turner, station commodore, reported to Admiral S. F. du Pont that Georgiana was evidently "sent into Charleston to receive her officers, to be fitted out as a cruiser there. She had 140 men on board, with an armament of guns and gun carriages in her hold, commanded by a British naval retired officer."

Loss

The Georgiana was lost on the night of 19 March 1863, while attempting to run past the Federal Blockading Squadron and into Charleston, South Carolina. She had been spotted by the armed U.S. Yacht  (of the famed America's Cup racing trophy) which alerted the remainder of the blockade fleet by shooting up colored signal flares. The Georgiana was sunk after a desperate chase in which she came so close to the big guns aboard the  that her crew even heard the orders being given on the U.S. vessel. With solid shot passing entirely though her hull, her propeller and rudder damaged, and with no hope for escape, Capt. A. B. Davidson flashed a white light in token of surrender, thus gaining time to beach his ship in fourteen feet (4.3 m) of water, three-quarters of a mile (1200 m) from shore and, after first scuttling her, escaped on the land side with all hands; this was construed as "the most consummate treachery" by the disappointed blockading crew, who would have shared in the proceeds from the prize.

Lt. Comdr. John L. Davis, commanding Wissahickon decided to set the wreck afire lest guerrilla bands from shore try to salvage her or her cargo: she burned for several days accompanied by large black powder explosions.

Georgiana and her cargo were owned by banking and shipping magnate George Trenholm of Charleston, who was Treasurer of the Confederacy and the primary historical figure behind the fictional Rhett Butler in Gone With The Wind.

Discovery
The wreck was discovered by underwater archaeologist E. Lee Spence in 1965.

Today the Georgiana sits on the bottom with her huge boiler only five feet (1.5 m) under the surface. She is now covered with a wide array of sea fan, sea whips, and living corals. Large sections of the hull are still intact. In places the starboard side of the hull protrudes over nine feet (3 m) from the sand.

The ship's deck was white pine and has long since been eaten away. Sea urchins and sea anemones abound on the wreck. The wreck is frequented by sea bass, grouper, flounder, stingrays, seahorses, and toadfish.

Near the forward cargo hatch Spence found boxes of pins and buttons. Spence recovered sundries, munitions, and medicines easily worth over $12 million (equivalent to $ million in ) but he never found the 350 pounds (160 kg) of gold believed to be hidden on the wreck. The gold could have a numismatic value of over $15 million (equivalent to $ million in ) . Other cargo could bring the Georgiana'''s total value to $50 million (equivalent to $ million in ) .

Resting on top of the Georgianas shattered wreckage is the remains of the sidewheel steamer Mary Bowers, which struck the wreck of the Georgiana while attempting to run the blockade into Charleston.

Wreck site
This wreck site is extremely important both historically and archaeologically."A Comment on Diving Operations in South Carolina," The Conference on Historic Site Archeology Papers 1969, (1971), Volume 4, part 2 Historically because of the emphasis both sides (the Confederates and the Federals) correctly or incorrectly placed on the Georgiana as a potential threat to United States shipping, and archaeologically due to the site containing two distinct types  of ships. Both ships were constructed of iron, but one was built with extra reinforcing and relatively deep draft such as would be needed for operation as a privateer on the high seas and the other of extremely light weight and shallow draft that was perfectly suited for the purpose of running the blockade, which required crossing shallow shoals to evade the deeper draft vessels of the blockade fleet. One (the Georgiana) is a screw steamer and the other (the Mary Bowers) a sidewheel steamer. The two ships were built and lost in a time span of about two years, making their design differences even more significant."Underwater Archeology in South Carolina," by E. Lee Spence, The Conference on Historic Site Archeology Papers 1970, (1971), Volume 5, Part 1

It was for the Georgiana/Mary Bowers wreck that the first salvage license in South Carolina was granted in 1967. Hundreds of thousands of individual artifacts were recovered from the site. The first dives by State officials on the site were made in 2010.

Confederate Cruiser, Privateer or Merchantman?
Due to the secrecy surrounding her construction, loading and sailing, there is considerable question as to whether the Georgiana was simply a merchantman or if she was intended as a privateer or blockade runner.  

One contemporary report described the Georgiana as so lightly built that "she would shake from stem to stern if a gun were fired from her decks."  Historian Stephen Wise describes her as a merchantman and writes "While loading in Liverpool, the Union consul Thomas Dudley carefully investigated the vessel and reported her to be too frail for a warship. He felt her only purpose was to run the blockade."  A United States consular dispatch dated 6 January 1863 stated: "The steamer Georgiana, just arrived at Liverpool from the Clyde. She is new and said to be a very superior steamer. ··· Yesterday while lying here she had the Rebel flag flying at her mast."  The London American took special note of her in its 28 January 1863 edition as a powerful steamer and remarked that her officers wore gold lace on their caps, considered a sure indication she was being groomed for a man-of-war. 

After the Georgianas loss on 19 March 1863, the United States Secretary of Navy wrote: "the destruction of the Georgiana not only touched their (the Confederate's) pockets, but their hopes. She was a splendid craft, peculiarly fitted for the business of privateering." The New York Times of 31 March 1863 gave a spy's description of the craft as "a superior vessel, ··· built expressly for the rebel navy." The London Times of 8 April 1863 described her as follows: "There is not the least doubt of her being intended as a privateer." Thomas Scharf (who had served in the Confederate navy), in his post-war reference work History of the Confederate Navy, stated: "Apart from her cargo, the loss was a serious one to the Confederacy, as she was a much faster and stronger ship than any one of its cruisers afloat and would have made a superb man-of-war." Underwater archaeologist E. Lee Spence, who discovered the wreck and identified it as the Georgiana, believes that she was indeed intended as a privateer or cruiser due to the naval guns found aboard, her deep draft hull construction, her heavier than standard iron planking, and the closer than normal, doubled up, Z-beam, framing used throughout the vessel.

See also
Confederate States Navy
Blockade runners of the American Civil War

References

BibliographySpence's Guide to South Carolina, by E. Lee Spence (Nelson Printing, Charleston, SC, 1976, OCLC: 2846435), pp. 1–5Treasures of the Confederate Coast: The "Real Rhett Butler" & Other Revelations, by Dr. E. Lee Spence (Narwhal Press, Charleston/Miami, 1995, OCLC 32431590)
"Wreck Chart," map by E. Lee Spence (Shipwreck Press, Sullivan's Island, SC, 1978, OCLC: 6270166)Shipwrecks of South Carolina and Georgia, 1520-1865, by E. Lee Spence (Sea Research Society, 1984, OCLC: 10593079), pp. 47–55, 634, 635, 656, 657, 722-736
"The Confederate Navy in Europe", Warren F Spencer  ULAP, p.6 6 A Look at South Carolina’s Underwater Heritage, by E. Lee Spence, (Nelson Southern Printing, Charleston, SC, 1974), pp. 6–9Spence’s Guide to South Carolina, by E. Lee Spence, (Nelson Southern Printing, Charleston, SC, 1976), pp. 1–5Lifeline of the Confederacy: Blockade Running During the Civil War, by Stephen R. Wise, (University of South Carolina, Columbia, SC, 1983), pp. 226, 229-232, 568, 569Charleston’s Maritime Heritage 1670-1865, by P.C. Coker III, (CokerCraft Press, Charleston, SC, 1987), pp. 214, 274, 286, 303Warships of the Civil War Navies, by Paul H. Silverstone, (Naval Institute Press, Annapolis, MD, 1989), p. 212The Blockade Runners'', by Dave Horner, (Florida Classics Library, Port Salerno, FL, 1992), Chapter 14, pp. 207–209, 223, 225

Cruisers of the Confederate States Navy
Privateer ships
Carolina
Disasters in South Carolina
Shipwrecks of the Carolina coast
Shipwrecks of the American Civil War
Maritime incidents in March 1863
Archaeological sites in South Carolina
Treasure from shipwrecks
Ships built on the River Clyde
Charleston County, South Carolina
1863 ships